The 1873 VMI Keydets football team represented the Virginia Military Institute (VMI) in the 1873 college football season, the school's first season of football. The team had no known coach.

Schedule

See also
 List of the first college football game in each US state

References

VMI
VMI Keydets football seasons
College football winless seasons
VMI Keydets football